The 1999 Women's European Volleyball Championship was the 21st edition of the event, organised by Europe's governing volleyball body, the Confédération Européenne de Volleyball. It was hosted in Rome and Perugia, Italy from 20 to 25 September 1999.

Participating teams

Format
The tournament was played in two different stages. In the first stage, the eight participants were divided in two groups of four teams each. A single round-robin format was played within each group to determine the teams' group position. The second stage of the tournament consisted of two sets of semifinals to determine the tournament final ranking. The group stage firsts and seconds played the semifinals for first to fourth place and group stage thirds and fourths played the fifth to eighth place semifinals. The pairing of the semifinals was made so teams played against the opposite group teams which finished in a different position (first played against second, third played against fourth).

Pools composition

Venues

Preliminary round

 All times are Central European Summer Time (UTC+02:00).

Pool A
venue location: PalaEUR, Rome, Italy

|}

|}

Pool B
venue location: PalaEvangelisti, Perugia, Italy

|}

|}

Final round
venue location: PalaEUR, Rome, Italy
 All times are Central European Summer Time (UTC+02:00).

5th–8th place
 Pools A and B third and fourth positions play each other.

5th–8th semifinals

|}

7th place match

|}

5th place match

|}

Final
 Pools A and B first and second positions play each other.

Semifinals

|}

3rd place match

|}

Final

|}

Final ranking

Individual awards
Most Valuable Player: 
Best Scorer: 
Best Blocker: 
Best Spiker: 
Best Server:

References
 Confédération Européenne de Volleyball (CEV)

External links
 Results at todor66.com

European Volleyball Championships
1999 in Italian women's sport
European Championship,1999
European Championship,1999,Women
1999
September 1999 sports events in Europe
1991,European Volleyball Championship,Women
European Championship,1999
Volleyball European Championship,1999